The Snowbank Trail is a hiking trail in the Boundary Waters Canoe Area Wilderness (BWCAW) in northern Minnesota. The trail runs the perimeter of Snowbank Lake and crosses the Kekekabic Trail at the south side of Snowbank Lake. The entire trail comprises a  loop, numerous campsites are available. During the BWCAW Visitor' Distribution Program (May 1 - September 30), permits are required for overnight use of the trail. It is located in Fall Lake Township in northernmost Lake County.

Editor's Note:  The Following information was obtained from a 2003 Forest Service Survey of the Trail.  A lot of stuff can happen over the years, including new beaver dams, bridges and campsites.  But this wiki has the basic information to help someone hike the trail.

The Snowbank Trail typically passes through rolling terrain of 0 to 20%.  If there are steeper grades it is noted in the text.  Smitty's on Snowbank is the closest resort to the Trailhead.  It is just up the road from the trailhead. They have motel rooms, cabins and are known for their Hungry Man Breakfast. They can also transport you and your gear across Snowbank Lake if you want to do some base camp hiking. Permit are needed for hiking in the designated wilderness area.  If you are just day hiking, you need to fill out a self issued permit located at the Trailhead. If you are camping overnight in the designated wilderness area, you will need to buy a fee permit which can be obtained at a Forest Service office or most Resorts and Outfitters.  Voyagers North Outfitters in Ely seems to be the place that is open the latest at night.  They are open until 10 pm during the season.

Hiking trails in Minnesota
Protected areas of Lake County, Minnesota